The small Japanese field mouse (Apodemus argenteus) is a species of rodent in the family Muridae. It is endemic to Japan.

References

Rats of Asia
Apodemus
Endemic mammals of Japan
Mammals described in 1844
Taxonomy articles created by Polbot